Omogymna is a genus of sea snails, marine gastropod mollusks in the family Olividae, the olives.

Species 
The following species are accepted in the genus Omogymna:

 Omogymna leonardi (Petuch & Sargent, 1986)
 Omogymna paxillus (Reeve, 1850)
 Omogymna richerti (Kay, 1979)
 Omogymna vullieti Petuch & R. F. Myers, 2014

References

Olividae
Gastropods described in 1897